The 62nd edition of the Vuelta a Colombia was held from 12 to 24 June 2012. It was won by the Colombian cyclist Félix Cárdenas.

References

Vuelta a Colombia
Colombia
Vuelta Colombia